Czarnocin  is a village in the administrative district of Gmina Leśnica, within Strzelce County, Opole Voivodeship, in south-western Poland.

The village has a population of 170.

References

Czarnocin